Vadaveekam is a village near Jayankondam, Ariyalur district, in the Indian state of Tamil Nadu.

Villages in Ariyalur district